Stéphanie Corinna Bille (29 August 1912 – 24 October 1979) was a French-speaking writer from Switzerland.

Bille was born in Lausanne, the daughter of Swiss painter Edmond Bille, and grew up in Sierre. Bille went to Paris, where she married but that marriage was later annulled. In 1937, she returned to Switzerland, where she fell gravely ill. After her recovery, Bille married the writer Maurice Chappaz.

She won the 1975 Prix Goncourt de la Nouvelle for La Demoiselle sauvage.

Several short stories and novels by Bille were translated into German and Italian and a few short stories were translated into English. In 2006, a collection of English translations of short stories and longer prose was published as The Transparent Girl and Other Stories.

Although Bille travelled extensively, she always returned home to Valais. She died in Sierre. Her estate is archived in the Swiss Literary Archives in Bern.

Selected works 
 Printemps (Spring), poetry (1939)
 Théoda, novel (1944)
 Le grand tourment (The great anguish), novellas (1951)
 Le sabot de Vénus (Venus' wooden shoes), novel (1952)
 Florilège alpestre (Alpine album), essay (1953)
 L'enfant aveugle (The blind child), stories (1955)
 Jeunesse d'un peintre (Youth of a painter) (1962), by Edmond Bille, as editor
 Le pays secret (The secret country), poetry (1963)
 Le mystère du monstre (Mystery of the monster), children's stories (1966)

References

External links
Publications by and about S. Corinna Bille in the catalogue Helveticat of the Swiss National Library
 

1912 births
1979 deaths
ETH Zurich alumni
Swiss writers in French
Swiss women poets
People from Lausanne
Swiss women novelists
20th-century Swiss poets
20th-century Swiss novelists
20th-century Swiss women writers
Prix Goncourt de la nouvelle recipients